James Bennett Milliken (born 1957) is the chancellor of the University of Texas System. He is the former chancellor of the City University of New York, the largest urban university system in the U.S. from 2014 to 2018, after serving as president of the University of Nebraska from 2004 to 2014, where he was also a professor at the School of Public Affairs and at the College of Law. He served as senior vice president of the University of North Carolina's 16-campus system from 1998 to 2004.  Before his career in academic administration, Milliken practiced law in New York City.

Early life and education
Milliken was raised in Fremont, Nebraska. He received his bachelor of arts degree with distinction from the University of Nebraska–Lincoln, in 1979. While at Nebraska, Milliken was a member of the Phi Delta Theta fraternity. 

After graduating from UNL, he spent a year working in Washington, D.C. as legislative assistant to Congresswoman Virginia D. Smith, R-Neb, who represented Nebraska's 3rd congressional district from 1975 to 1991. Milliken earned a J.D. degree in 1983 from New York University School of Law; he was a Root-Tilden Scholar and research assistant to Professor Norman Dorsen, then-president of the American Civil Liberties Union. After graduating from NYU Law, Milliken worked for the Legal Aid Society's Civil Division in New York City, then as an attorney at Cadwalader, Wickersham & Taft.

Career
Milliken was named Chancellor of the University of Texas System in August, 2018. The UT System Board of Regents touted Milliken’s rich higher education experience over three decades and his track record of success in creating and executing strategic plans. 

In a radio interview with KUT in October, 2022, Milliken announced that the UT System had exceeded enrollment of 244,000 students,system-wide, for the first time in history. Milliken credited the system’s enrollment growth to improved access through the UT Regents’ Promise Plus endowment. Launched in 2022, Promise Plus is a $300 million endowment that was created by the UT System regents in order to reduce the cost of higher education for lower income students. The fund covers tuition at seven UT System universities and complements a similar need-based financial aid program at the University of Texas at Austin.  

Under Millken’s watch as UT Chancellor the board of regents also invested in student well-being, approving a $16.5 million  investment to “expand and improve student mental health services, student safety and alcohol education resources” at UT’s 13 institutions.  

Prior to his arrival in Texas, Milliken returned to his native Nebraska in 1988 where he accepted the position of executive assistant to the president of the University of Nebraska, and he was subsequently appointed Secretary to the Board of Regents and Vice President for External Affairs.

In 1998, Milliken was appointed by then-president of the University of North Carolina, Molly Corbett Broad to lead university-wide strategy, institutional research, state and federal relations, public affairs, and economic development. In 2000, Milliken helped pass a statewide referendum for a $3.1 billion bond issue for university and community college facilities.

Milliken was appointed president of the University of Nebraska in 2004. He worked to expand access and launched CollegeBound Nebraska, which provided free tuition to Nebraska Pell Grant recipients, University of Nebraska Online Worldwide, and Nebraska Innovation Campus, a public-private research and development park located on the former state fair grounds next to the University of Nebraska-Lincoln campus. He subsequently led a $1.8 billion capital campaign, funding new institutes for early childhood (Buffett Early Childhood Institute), global food and water sustainability (Daugherty Water for Food Global Institute) and rural sustainability (Rural Futures Institute). Milliken also helped lead the Nebraska P-16 Initiative to improve primary education and increase college preparation. He expanded the University's global reach, establishing new programs, with universities, the private sector and government, in China, India, Brazil and Turkey.

Milliken became Chancellor of the City University of New York in 2014, and held the position through 2018.  While at CUNY, Milliken was lauded for improving access to higher education and expanded an initiative called ASAP, or Accelerated Study in Associate Programs, that provided financial help, including free MetroCard fare, and tutors. CUNY’s graduation rates climbed and gained national recognition for the ASAP program.  In November 2016, an interim report of an investigation conducted by the office of New York State Inspector General found "financial waste and abuse", citing shoddy oversight and mismanagement that created a system ripe for financial waste and abuse, and criticized Milliken and CUNY General Counsel Frederick Schaffer, among others. The 2016 report was based on findings that pre-dated Milliken’s time as chancellor of CUNY and a group of New York city council members suggested  New York State Governor Andrew Cuomowas using the report to politicize the system.  During the year preceding Milliken's resignation due to health concerns,  Cuomo replaced CUNY Board of Trustees chairmen Benno C. Schmidt Jr. with a new chairmen Bill Thompson, and nearly all of the members of CUNY's board of trustees with a new politically prominent bloc.  

Milliken is a member of the Council on Foreign Relations, Business Higher Education Forum, and on the executive committee of the Council on Competitiveness. He formerly served as a director on the board of the Association of Public and Land-grant Universities (APLU), and led the Commission on Innovation, Competition and Economic Prosperity.

Personal life
Since 1989, Milliken has been married to Nana Graves Hilliard Smith, a graduate of Yale University, and New York University School of Law. They have three children.

References

Living people
People from Fremont, Nebraska
University of Nebraska–Lincoln alumni
New York University School of Law alumni
Presidents of the University of Nebraska System
People associated with Cadwalader, Wickersham & Taft
1957 births
Chancellors of City University of New York